Juan Ignacio Vieyra (born 20 April 1992) is an Argentine professional footballer who plays as a central midfielder for Marathón in Honduras.

Career
Vieyra began his senior career with Newell's Old Boys. He made his first-team bow on 8 December 2012 during an Argentine Primera División win away to Argentinos Juniors, which preceded a further six appearances for the midfielder in 2012–13; including his Copa Libertadores debut against Olimpia in February 2013. In total, Vieyra featured in fifteen games for Newell's in four seasons; though didn't start a league game in that time. In January 2016, Vieyra went to Paraguay with Cerro Porteño. He was selected just four times in 2016, which preceded Vieyra departing on loan to fellow Paraguayan Primera División team Nacional in 2017.

Vieyra scored on his Nacional debut, netting his first senior goal in a home loss to Deportivo Capiatá; that was one of four goals in his first campaign with them. He remained to play in two more seasons with Nacional, scoring thirteen times in the process; which included braces in 2018 over Guaraní and 3 de Febrero. Midway through 2019, on 1 August, Vieyra agreed a move back to his homeland with Huracán. His bow arrived on 18 August versus Patronato as they lost 2–1, though Vieyra did assist his team's goal. Vieyra netted his first Argentine top-flight goal in February 2020 against Godoy Cruz. He departed the club months later.

In July 2020, Vieyra headed to Central Córdoba. Following spells at Delfín in Colombia and at Cobresal in Chile, Vieyra moved to Honduras at the end of January 2022, where he signed with Marathón.

Career statistics
.

Honours
Newell's Old Boys
Argentine Primera División: 2012–13 Torneo Final

References

External links

1992 births
Living people
People from Arrecifes
Argentine footballers
Argentine expatriate footballers
Association football midfielders
Argentine Primera División players
Paraguayan Primera División players
Newell's Old Boys footballers
Cerro Porteño players
Club Nacional footballers
Club Atlético Huracán footballers
Central Córdoba de Santiago del Estero footballers
Cobresal footballers
Delfín S.C. footballers
C.D. Marathón players
Argentine expatriate sportspeople in Paraguay
Argentine expatriate sportspeople in Colombia
Argentine expatriate sportspeople in Chile
Argentine expatriate sportspeople in Honduras
Expatriate footballers in Paraguay
Expatriate footballers in Colombia
Expatriate footballers in Chile
Expatriate footballers in Honduras
Sportspeople from Buenos Aires Province